Bimble's Bucket was an animated progamme shown on CITV created by Michael Jupp, the creator of The Dreamstone and produced by Martin Gates Productions for HTV. The show ran for 3 series between 1996 and 1998. The rights to this show are currently owned by Monster Entertainment as of 2014.

Plot
The main character of the series was Bimble, a young male anthropomorphic creature (a fox rabbit hybrid creature of whom some fans dub his species as 'foxbits' unofficially, though Mike Jupp had given them an official name called 'Squonks', it was never mentioned on the show) who, after rescuing a man from sinking in a swamp by pulling a bucket from his head, was given the very bucket he pulled off as a reward for rescuing the man. Soon Bimble is introduced to Teeny Weeny, a small green female character (who has leaves and an acorn on her head) and the guardian of the bucket. He also found out the bucket would grant wishes if he needed any particular item, but the effects would only last for 24 hours). The bucket is damaged in the first episode of the series when it is attacked by slingshots.

A witch called Dolly Clackhanger would try to steal the bucket from Bimble, many times, for her queen, Kak. She usually sent her gang to steal it. They consist of two Sleazians from Sleaze City who look like punk rockers called Bilge and Oiler, who usually go around on motorised pogo sticks. They were the ones who dented the bucket to begin with. Dolly also has an odd-looking blue creature with green hair called Sploot, who is usually Dolly's guinea pig for her magical experiments.

Queen Kak is also assisted by her tax collector Mudge, another Sleazian wearing a pork pie hat. He would rather perform scientific experiments instead of collecting taxes for the queen, and he dislikes Dolly and her magic.

TV airings
The series aired in the United Kingdom on CITV from 1996–1998 and was later repeated on Pop in 2004. It has also aired on Nine Network in Australia.

Voice team

Series 1 
Julia McKenzie (Dolly Clackhanger/Narrator), Ellie Beaven (Teeny Weeny), Jonathan Kydd (Mudge / Mr. Gallypot), Gary Martin (Sploot), Lewis MacLeod (Bimble), Kate Robbins (Oiler)

Series 2/3 
Julia McKenzie (Narrator/Dolly Clackhanger), Ellie Beaven (Teeny Weeny), Maria Darling, Sally Kinghorn, Gary Martin (Sploot), Paul Panting (Bimble), Richard Tate (Mudge / Mayor of Stiltsville)

Episode list
Series One: (25 minute episodes)

 The Beginning - First broadcast: 5/1/1996
 The Really Bad Idea - First broadcast: 15/1/1996
 Mistaken Identity - First broadcast: 22/1/1996
 The Catastrophe - First broadcast: 29/1/1996
 The Journey - First broadcast: 3/5/1996
 Pogo Time - First broadcast: 10/5/1996
 The Birds - First broadcast: 17/5/1996
 Marooned - First broadcast: 24/5/1996
 Nearly - First broadcast: 31/5/1996
 The Moon Bridge - First broadcast: 7/6/1996
 The Carpet - First broadcast: 14/6/1996
 Catnap - First broadcast: 21/6/1996
 The Return - First broadcast: 28/6/1996

Series Two: (10-minute episodes)

 The Cauldron – First broadcast: 4/2/1997
 The Bubble - First broacast: 11/2/1997No episode shown on 18/02/1997 due to being half-term and CITV were showing a series of programmes called Gogglewatch during the week.
 The Fair - First broadcast: 25/2/1997
 ???? - First broadcast: 4/3/1997
 Sploot's Monster - First broadcast: 11/3/1997
 Dolly Rules - first aired: 18/3/1997
 A Question of Colours - First broadcast: 25/3/1997
 Keep Fit - First broadcast: 1/4/1997
 The Plant - First broadcast: 8/4/1997
 ???? (the lightning episode) - First broadcast: 15/4/1997
 The Robot - First broadcast: 22/4/1997
 Vandals - First broadcast: 29/4/1997
 ???? (the cold cure episode) - First broadcast: 6/5/1997

Series Three: (10-minute episodes)

 Small - First broadcast: 27/4/19984/5/98 was Bank Holiday, so no episode was transmitted.
 Dad's Tomatoes - First broadcast: 11/5/1998
 Fairy Tale Day - First broadcast: 18/5/199825/5/98 was Public Holiday, so again no episode was televised.
 The Sludge Monster - First broadcast: 1/6/1998
 The Freeze - First broadcast: 8/6/1998There was no episode aired on 15/6/98 due to the Romania v Colombia match in the 1998 FIFA World Cup.
 The Celebration - first aired: 22/6/1998
 The Bird (different episode from Series 1 "The Birds") - first aired: 29/6/1998
 ???? - first aired: 6/7/1998
 ???? - first aired: 13/7/1998
 Pirates - first aired: 20/7/1998
 Sweetie - first aired: 27/7/1998
 Weather Witch - first aired: 3/8/1998
 Invisible - first aired: 10/8/1998
 Sheep - first aired: 17/8/1998An episode was broadcast on 24/8/98 but a lot of newspapers billed this as a repeat.

Unplaced: The Hypnopipe, Queen Kak's Birthday, The Crab and The Pogo Tournament

Home Media releases
English home video company First Independent released one VHS title in the UK which contained the first 3 episodes and is quite rare.

Credits

Series 1 

 Written by  Sue Radley and Martin Gates
 Original Concept and Design by  Mike Jupp
 Music Written and Composed by  Chris Caswell
 Animation Directors  Simon Ward-Horner, Chris Randall, David Elvin, Greg Ingram
 Directed by  Martin Gates
 Dialogue Recording Engineer  Ben Leeves
 Dubbing Editors  Kevin Brazier, Alan Sallabank
 Dubbing Mixer  David Humphries
 Sound Re-recorded at  DB Post Production
 Negative Cutting  Mike Fraser
 Telecine Grader  Alan Bishop
 Video Editor  Neville Donoghue
 Film Editor  David Hillier
 Production Facilities  Moving Images International
 Managing Director  Jimmy Costello
 Head of Production  Louie Jhocson
 Production Facilities  Sae Rom Animation
 President  Kil Whan Kim
 Production Assistants  Emma MacGregor, Samantha Warden, Charlotte Simpson-Orlebar
 Production Secretary  Sarah Absalom
 Production Co-ordinator  Robert Dunbar
 Production Manager  Stuart Lock
 Storyboard  Mike Jupp, Gordon Harrison, David Elvin, Keith Scoble, Greg Ingram, Bruce McNally, Marty Murphy
 Timing  Paul Stibal, Dick Horn, Duncan Varley
 Art Direction and Timing  Barry Macey
 Edit and Story Supervisor  Sue Radley
 Executive Producers  Dan Maddicot, Tom Parkhouse
 Line Producer  Marion Edwards
 Produced by  Martin Gates

Series 2–3 

 Written by Sue Radley and Martin Gates
 Original Concept and Design by Mike Jupp
 Music Written and Composed by Chris Caswell
 Animation Directors Chris Randall, Vincent Woodcock
 Directed by Martin Gates
 Dialogue Recording Engineer Ben Leeves
 Dubbing Editor Kevin Brazier
 Dubbing Mixers David Humphries, Alan Sallabank
 Sound Re-recorded at DB Post Production
 Negative Cutting Mike Fraser
 Telecine Grader Ray King
 Video Editor Andrew Mitchell
 Film Editor David Hillier
 Production Facilities Hong Ying Animation
 General Manager Bobby Hsieu
 Production Manager Tom Pong
 Production Assistants Charlotte Simpson-Orlebar, Ellen Moreno, Samantha Warden
 Production Secretary Sarah Absalom
 Assistant Producer Emma MacGregor
 Production Co-ordinator Robert Dunbar
 Production Manager Stuart Lock
 Songs and Music Published by Telestar Management Ltd.
 Character Development Alan Case, Leila Marr
 Storyboards Gordon Harrison, Mike Jupp, Barry Macey, Clive Pallant, Vince James & Jez Hall, Michael Zarb, Marty Murphy
 Timing Chris Cuddington, Barry Macey
 Edit and Story Supervisor Sue Radley
 Executive Producers Dan Maddicott, Tom Parkhouse
 Producer Martin Gates

References

External links
 Mike Jupp's official homepage
 Mike Jupp's official forum
 Bimble's Bucket's page on Monster's official website

1990s British television series
British animated television series
Fantasy television series
ITV children's television shows
Television series by ITV Studios